Severo-Yeniseysky is an urban locality (an urban-type settlement) in Severo-Yeniseysky District of Krasnoyarsk Krai, Russia. Population:

Climate
Severo-Yeniseysky has subarctic climate (Köppen climate classification Dfc) with mild summers and severely cold winters.

See also
Severo-Yeniseysk Airport
Yenisei Range

References

Urban-type settlements in Krasnoyarsk Krai
Severo-Yeniseysky District